Mario + Rabbids Sparks of Hope is a 2022 action-adventure turn-based strategy video game developed by Ubisoft Milan and Ubisoft Paris and published by Ubisoft for the Nintendo Switch. The game is a crossover between Nintendo's Mario and Ubisoft's Rabbids franchises and is a sequel to Mario + Rabbids Kingdom Battle (August 29, 2017). It was released worldwide on October 20, 2022. Three downloadable content expansions are also in development, one featuring Rayman.

Sparks of Hope received generally positive reviews from critics, with praise towards the game's graphics, soundtrack, gameplay, and improvements to the battle system, though the loading times received some criticism. According to Ubisoft, the game underperformed commercially.

Gameplay 

Gameplay in Sparks of Hope is largely similar to that of Kingdom Battle. Players are able to build out their roster of characters from, Rabbid Peach, Rabbid Luigi, and Rabbid Mario, along with new characters Edge, Rabbid Rosalina, and Bowser (with the Rabbids being fully voiced for the first time). Players are also tasked with rescuing the Sparks throughout the galaxy, who provide distinct powers that will help the player in battle.

Unlike the first game, level designs are less linear, and the turn-based tactical combat features a new system that disregards the first game's grid-based layout. Also featured are enemy encounters outside of turn-based combat. Mario can now be replaced by a different character. Lead designer Xavier Manzanares, speaking about the new combat, stated: "You can move in this area of movement the way you want; you can dash a Bob-omb, then you have it in your hand. You can move around as you want, but then it's going to explode. So, you have a few seconds to react, which is completely different from what we had in the past. And so, it brings this real-time element to the mix".

Plot

Sparks of Hope 
Sometime after the events of Mario + Rabbids: Kingdom Battle, the inhabitants of the Mushroom Kingdom, including Mario, Luigi, and Princess Peach, now peacefully coexist with the Rabbids and their Rabbid counterparts. The calm is suddenly broken when a horde of Rabbid-Luma hybrids called Sparks descend from the sky, pursued by a gigantic manta ray imbued with Darkmess, a shadowy corruptive substance. Rabbid Peach is accidentally abducted by the manta while attempting to take a selfie; Mario and their combat advisor drone Beep-0 free her from the Darkmess dimension inside the manta with the help of the Sparks. A malevolent entity known as Cursa then appears and attempts to destroy Mario, Rabbid Peach, and Beep-0, but the other heroes save them with a spaceship constructed from the Rabbids' Time Washing Machine. The ship's A.I., JEANIE, explains that the unique fusion of Rabbid and Luma DNA grants the Sparks unlimited power, and Cursa, whose corruptive influence has spread across the galaxy, wants to absorb that power for itself. The team resolves to find Cursa's stronghold and defeat them, saving as many Sparks and corrupted planets as possible, while also searching for Rosalina, the missing guardian of the Lumas.

Mario's team travels to five different planets while gathering enough Purified Darkmess Crystals to safely travel to Cursa's stronghold – Beacon Beach, Pristine Peaks, Palette Prime, Terra Flora, and Barrendale Mesa. They are joined by three new heroes along the way: Edge, a stoic sword-wielding Rabbid also looking to save the Sparks; Rabbid Rosalina, a gloomy but intelligent Rabbid who is trying to find her hero Rosalina; and Bowser, Mario’s perpetual archnemesis whose army has been brainwashed by Cursa. Together, they help the wardens of each world dispel the Darkmess infection while also battling Cursa's team of corrupted Rabbids, brainwashed minions of Bowser, and the Spark Hunters – three female Rabbid hybrids named Midnite, Bedrock, and Daphne. Near the end of their journey, Cursa once again attempts to destroy the heroes but unexpectedly transforms into Rosalina, whose body has been merged and possessed by Cursa's spirit. Rosalina gives the team a crystal and helps them escape before Cursa regains control; from the crystal, they learn that Cursa was originally a surviving fragment of the Megabug, which was cast out into space and was merged/empowered by space debris, eventually gaining sentience, desiring to feed upon the life energies of the galaxy to grow. It ambushed the Comet Observatory, home to Rosalina, the Lumas, and a group of Rabbids, in an attempt to steal the space station's and the Lumas' power, but accidentally merged the Rabbids and Lumas together in a blast of energy when Rosalina sacrificed herself to ensure their safety, turning them into Sparks. Cursa needed to gather the Sparks' power in order to crush Rosalina's rebelling will against her possession.

The team reaches Cursa's stronghold and destroys its protective shield with one of the wardens' inventions, revealing the Comet Observatory. In a frantic attempt to stop them, Cursa creates Darkmess clones of Bowser and Edge derived from the Megabug's and Cursa's record of their DNA. Edge admits that she is also a creation of Cursa and was once the leader of the Spark Hunters, but betrayed her creator after gaining free will while her comrades maintained their loyalty to Cursa. Although she attempts to leave in shame, the other heroes refuse to cast her out and at last confront Cursa. After a protracted battle, Cursa releases both Rosalina and the energy of the absorbed Sparks but makes one last-ditch effort to destroy them in its true form. The nine heroes, the Sparks, and Rosalina all combine their power into a final attack, which eradicates Cursa for good. Everyone returns to the Mushroom Kingdom, where Rosalina congratulates them for their efforts in saving the Sparks, the galaxy, and herself. Both Rabbid Rosalina and Edge decide to stay with the heroes, and Rosalina gives a final thank-you to Mario and Bowser before departing. Rabbid Mario, Rabbid Luigi, and Rabbid Peach attempt to play with an irritated Bowser, forcing Mario to save them from his fire breath, and Beep-0 connects with the now-sentient JEANIE in a post-credits scene.

Tower of Doooom 
The heroes are summoned by Madame Bwahstrella, a fortune teller Rabbid from the main and previous games, to a large tower called the Tower of Doooom. She tasks them with rescuing Spawny, who is held hostage at the top of the tower by Cursa's minions. Once Spawny is rescued, he bids the heroes farewell and leaves to continue traveling the galaxy.

Development 
Mario + Rabbids Sparks of Hope was announced at E3 2021 and released on October 20, 2022. The game was a co-op development by Ubisoft Paris and Ubisoft Milan, with additional work by Ubisoft Pune, Ubisoft Chengdu and Ubisoft Montpellier. Creative director Davide Soliani stated that the development team had viewed the game as a spiritual successor to the first, and as a different take on the tactical genre in part due to the game having expanded beyond the Mushroom Kingdom to focus on a range of galactic locations. Its soundtrack was written by Grant Kirkhope (who composed the soundtrack for the first game), Gareth Coker (who composed the soundtrack for Ubisoft's Immortals Fenyx Rising), and Yoko Shimomura (who previously composed for the Mario & Luigi series).

The game is set to receive three downloadable content expansions via a season pass in 2023, including one featuring Rayman as a playable character.
	
These three expansions, according to a Twitter post, include the Tower of Doooom (spelled with four "o"s), a post-game adventure featuring a new, mysterious villain in an enchanted forest-like planet, and the said Rayman adventure. The first was released on March 2, 2023, the second will be released in mid 2023, and the third in late 2023.

Reception 

Mario + Rabbids Sparks of Hope received "generally favorable reviews", according to the review aggregator Metacritic, with many considering it an improvement over Kingdom Battle.

Mario + Rabbids Sparks of Hope sold 17,647 physical copies within its first week of release in Japan, making it the third bestselling retail game of the week in the country. However, according to Ubisoft, the game underperformed in the final weeks of 2022 and early January.

Accolades

See also 
 Rabbids
 Rayman

Notes

References

External links 
 

2022 video games
Crossover video games
Rabbids
Mario role-playing games
Rayman
Ubisoft games
Nintendo Switch games
Nintendo Switch-only games
Turn-based tactics video games
Tactical role-playing video games
Single-player video games
Video games about rabbits and hares
Video games scored by Grant Kirkhope
Video games scored by Gareth Coker
Video games scored by Yoko Shimomura
Video games set on fictional planets
Video games with downloadable content
Video games developed in Italy
Video games developed in France
D.I.C.E. Award for Family Game of the Year winners
The Game Awards winners